Antônio Dumas Ramalho Esteves (28 November 1955 – 30 December 2019) was a Brazilian football player and manager.

Playing career
He played for Esporte Clube Bahia, Desportiva Leônico, Santos, S.C. Olhanense and G.D. Chaves.

Coaching career
He coached a number of teams in Brazil, and Gabon, São Tomé and Príncipe, Togo and Equatorial Guinea in Africa.

Dumas explained in a letter sent to a Brazilian media that he wasn't dismissed from the Togolese national team. It was he who wanted to leave, having received the job offer from the Equatoguinean Football Federation to be the coach of its national team.

Later life and death
He died on 30 December 2019, aged 64.

References

1955 births
2019 deaths
People from Santo André, São Paulo
Brazilian footballers
Esporte Clube Bahia players
Santos FC players
S.C. Olhanense players
G.D. Chaves players
Brazilian football managers
Expatriate football managers in Gabon
Gabon national football team managers
Expatriate football managers in São Tomé and Príncipe
São Tomé and Príncipe national football team managers
Expatriate football managers in Togo
Togo national football team managers
Expatriate football managers in Equatorial Guinea
Equatorial Guinea national football team managers
Expatriate football managers in Tunisia
2000 African Cup of Nations managers
JS Kairouan managers
AS Gabès managers
Association footballers not categorized by position
Footballers from São Paulo (state)